Jānis Paukštello (born 26 March 1951) is a Latvian actor. In the theater, since the 1970s he has worked for Dailes teātris. He has also taken part in several films.

Filmography

References

External links

Jānis Paukštello at the Dailes teātris homepage

1951 births
Living people
Latvian male stage actors
Latvian male film actors
20th-century Latvian male actors
21st-century Latvian male actors
People from Jaunpiebalga Municipality